Dijkstra's algorithm is an algorithm for finding the shortest paths between nodes in a weighted graph, which may represent, for example, road networks.  It was conceived by computer scientist Edsger W. Dijkstra in 1956 and published three years later.

The algorithm exists in many variants. Dijkstra's original algorithm found the shortest path between two given nodes, but a more common variant fixes a single node as the "source" node and finds shortest paths from the source to all other nodes in the graph, producing a shortest-path tree.

For a given source node in the graph, the algorithm finds the shortest path between that node and every other. It can also be used for finding the shortest paths from a single node to a single destination node by stopping the algorithm once the shortest path to the destination node has been determined. For example, if the nodes of the graph represent cities and costs of edge paths represent driving distances between pairs of cities connected by a direct road (for simplicity, ignore red lights, stop signs, toll roads and other obstructions), then Dijkstra's algorithm can be used to find the shortest route between one city and all other cities. A widely used application of shortest path algorithms is network routing protocols, most notably IS-IS (Intermediate System to Intermediate System) and OSPF (Open Shortest Path First). It is also employed as a subroutine in other algorithms such as Johnson's.

The Dijkstra algorithm uses labels that are positive integers or real numbers, which are totally ordered.  It can be generalized to use any labels that are partially ordered, provided the subsequent labels (a subsequent label is produced when traversing an edge) are monotonically non-decreasing.  This generalization is called the generic Dijkstra shortest-path algorithm.

Dijkstra's algorithm uses a data structure for storing and querying partial solutions sorted by distance from the start. Dijkstra's original algorithm does not use a min-priority queue and runs in time (where  is the number of nodes). This is asymptotically the fastest known single-source shortest-path algorithm for arbitrary directed graphs with unbounded non-negative weights. However, specialized cases (such as bounded/integer weights, directed acyclic graphs etc.) can indeed be improved further as detailed in Specialized variants. Additionally, if preprocessing is allowed algorithms such as contraction hierarchies can be up to seven orders of magnitude faster.

In some fields, artificial intelligence in particular, Dijkstra's algorithm or a variant of it is known as uniform cost search and formulated as an instance of the more general idea of best-first search.

History 

Dijkstra thought about the shortest path problem when working at the Mathematical Center in Amsterdam in 1956 as a programmer to demonstrate the capabilities of a new computer called ARMAC. His objective was to choose both a problem and a solution (that would be produced by computer) that non-computing people could understand. He designed the shortest path algorithm and later implemented it for ARMAC for a slightly simplified transportation map of 64 cities in the Netherlands (64, so that 6 bits would be sufficient to encode the city number). A year later, he came across another problem from hardware engineers working on the institute's next computer: minimize the amount of wire needed to connect the pins on the back panel of the machine. As a solution, he re-discovered the algorithm known as Prim's minimal spanning tree algorithm (known earlier to Jarník, and also rediscovered by Prim). Dijkstra published the algorithm in 1959, two years after Prim and 29 years after Jarník.

Algorithm 

Let the node at which we are starting be called the initial node. Let the distance of node Y be the distance from the initial node to Y. Dijkstra's algorithm will initially start with infinite distances and will try to improve them step by step.

 Mark all nodes unvisited. Create a set of all the unvisited nodes called the unvisited set.
 Assign to every node a tentative distance value: set it to zero for our initial node and to infinity for all other nodes. During the run of the algorithm, the tentative distance of a node v is the length of the shortest path discovered so far between the node v and the starting node. Since initially no path is known to any other vertex than the source itself (which is a path of length zero), all other tentative distances are initially set to infinity. Set the initial node as current.
 For the current node, consider all of its unvisited neighbors and calculate their tentative distances through the current node. Compare the newly calculated tentative distance to the one currently assigned to the neighbor and assign it the smaller one. For example, if the current node A is marked with a  distance of 6, and the edge connecting it with a neighbor B has length 2, then the distance to B through A will be 6 + 2 = 8. If B was previously marked with a distance greater than 8 then change it to 8. Otherwise, the current value will be kept.
 When we are done considering all of the unvisited neighbors of the current node, mark the current node as visited and remove it from the unvisited set. A visited node will never be checked again (this is valid and optimal in connection with the behavior in step 6.: that the next nodes to visit will always be in the order of 'smallest distance from initial node first' so any visits after would have a greater distance).

 If the destination node has been marked visited (when planning a route between two specific nodes) or if the smallest tentative distance among the nodes in the unvisited set is infinity (when planning a complete traversal; occurs when there is no connection between the initial node and remaining unvisited nodes), then stop. The algorithm has finished.
 Otherwise, select the unvisited node that is marked with the smallest tentative distance, set it as the new current node, and go back to step 3.

When planning a route, it is actually not necessary to wait until the destination node is "visited" as above: the algorithm can stop once the destination node has the smallest tentative distance among all "unvisited" nodes (and thus could be selected as the next "current").

Description 

Suppose you would like to find the shortest path between two intersections on a city map: a starting point and a destination. Dijkstra's algorithm initially marks the distance (from the starting point) to every other intersection on the map with infinity. This is done not to imply that there is an infinite distance, but to note that those intersections have not been visited yet. Some variants of this method leave the intersections' distances unlabeled. Now select the current intersection at each iteration.  For the first iteration, the current intersection will be the starting point, and the distance to it (the intersection's label) will be zero. For subsequent iterations (after the first), the current intersection will be a closest unvisited intersection to the starting point (this will be easy to find).

From the current intersection, update the distance to every unvisited intersection that is directly connected to it. This is done by determining the sum of the distance between an unvisited intersection and the value of the current intersection and then relabeling the unvisited intersection with this value (the sum) if it is less than the unvisited intersection's current value. In effect, the intersection is relabeled if the path to it through the current intersection is shorter than the previously known paths.  To facilitate shortest path identification, in pencil, mark the road with an arrow pointing to the relabeled intersection if you label/relabel it, and erase all others pointing to it.  After you have updated the distances to each neighboring intersection, mark the current intersection as visited and select an unvisited intersection with minimal distance (from the starting point) – or the lowest label—as the current intersection. Intersections marked as visited are labeled with the shortest path from the starting point to it and will not be revisited or returned to.

Continue this process of updating the neighboring intersections with the shortest distances, marking the current intersection as visited, and moving onto a closest unvisited intersection until you have marked the destination as visited. Once you have marked the destination as visited (as is the case with any visited intersection), you have determined the shortest path to it from the starting point and can trace your way back following the arrows in reverse. In the algorithm's implementations, this is usually done (after the algorithm has reached the destination node) by following the nodes' parents from the destination node up to the starting node; that's why we also keep track of each node's parent.

This algorithm makes no attempt of direct "exploration" towards the destination as one might expect. Rather, the sole consideration in determining the next "current" intersection is its distance from the starting point. This algorithm therefore expands outward from the starting point, interactively considering every node that is closer in terms of shortest path distance until it reaches the destination. When understood in this way, it is clear how the algorithm necessarily finds the shortest path. However, it may also reveal one of the algorithm's weaknesses: its relative slowness in some topologies.

Pseudocode

The  array contains pointers to previous-hop nodes on the shortest path from source to the given vertex (equivalently, it is the next-hop on the path from the given vertex to the source). The variable  on line 14 is the length of the path from the root node to the neighbor node  if it were to go through .

  1  function Dijkstra(Graph, source):
  2      
  3      for each vertex v in Graph.Vertices:
  4          dist[v] ← INFINITY
  5          prev[v] ← UNDEFINED
  6          add v to Q
  7      dist[source] ← 0
  8      
  9      while Q is not empty:
 10          u ← vertex in Q with min dist[u]
 11          remove u from Q
 12          
 13          for each neighbor v of u still in Q:
 14              alt ← dist[u] + Graph.Edges(u, v)
 15              if alt < dist[v]:
 16                  dist[v] ← alt
 17                  prev[v] ← u
 18
 19      return dist[], prev[]

 1  S ← empty sequence
 2  u ← target
 3  if prev[u] is defined or u = source:          // Do something only if the vertex is reachable
 4      while u is defined:                       // Construct the shortest path with a stack S
 5          insert u at the beginning of S        // Push the vertex onto the stack
 6          u ← prev[u]                           // Traverse from target to source

Then instead of storing only a single node in each entry of  we would store all nodes satisfying the relaxation condition. When the algorithm completes,  data structure will actually describe a graph that is a subset of the original graph with some edges removed. Its key property will be that if the algorithm was run with some starting node, then every path from that node to any other node in the new graph will be the shortest path between those nodes in the original graph, and all paths of that length from the original graph will be present in the new graph. Then to actually find all these shortest paths between two given nodes we would use a path finding algorithm on the new graph, such as depth-first search.

Using a priority queue

As mentioned earlier, using such a data structure can lead to faster computing times than using a basic queue. Notably, Fibonacci heap or Brodal queue offer optimal implementations for those 3 operations. As the algorithm is slightly different, it is mentioned here, in pseudocode as well:

 1  function Dijkstra(Graph, source):
 2      dist[source] ← 0                           // Initialization
 3
 4      create vertex priority queue Q
 5
 6      for each vertex v in Graph.Vertices:
 7          if v ≠ source
 8              dist[v] ← INFINITY                 // Unknown distance from source to v
 9              prev[v] ← UNDEFINED                // Predecessor of v
 10
 11         Q.add_with_priority(v, dist[v])
 12
 13
 14     while Q is not empty:                      // The main loop
 15         u ← Q.extract_min()                    // Remove and return best vertex
 16         for each neighbor v of u:              // Go through all v neighbors of u
 17             alt ← dist[u] + Graph.Edges(u, v)
 18             if alt < dist[v]:
 19                 dist[v] ← alt
 20                 prev[v] ← u
 21                 Q.decrease_priority(v, alt)
 22
 23     return dist, prev

Instead of filling the priority queue with all nodes in the initialization phase, it is also possible to initialize it to contain only source; then, inside the if alt < dist[v] block, the  becomes an  operation if the node is not already in the queue.

Yet another alternative is to add nodes unconditionally to the priority queue and to instead check after extraction that it isn't revisiting, or that no shorter connection was found yet. This can be done by additionally extracting the associated priority p from the queue and only processing further if p == dist[u] inside the while Q is not empty loop. 

These alternatives can use entirely array-based priority queues without decrease-key functionality, which have been found to achieve even faster computing times in practice. However, the difference in performance was found to be narrower for denser graphs.

Proof of correctness 

Proof of Dijkstra's algorithm is constructed by induction on the number of visited nodes.

(Note: we do not assume  is the actual shortest distance for unvisited nodes, while  is the actual shortest distance)

The base case is when there is just one visited node, namely the initial node , in which case the hypothesis is trivial.

Next, assume the hypothesis for k-1 visited nodes. Next, we choose  to be the next visited node according to the algorithm.

To prove that claim, we will proceed with a proof by contradiction. If there were a shorter path, then there can be two cases, either the shortest path contains another unvisited node or not.

In the first case, let  be the first unvisited node on the shortest path.

Now we arrived at a contradiction that  <  yet  + a positive number < .

In the second case, let  be the last but one node on the shortest path. That means . That is a contradiction because by the time  is visited, it should have set  to at most . 

For all other visited nodes , the induction hypothesis told us  is the shortest distance from  already, and the algorithm step is not changing that.

Running time 

Bounds of the running time of Dijkstra's algorithm on a graph with edges  and vertices  can be expressed as a function of the number of edges, denoted , and the number of vertices, denoted , using big-O notation. The complexity bound depends mainly on the data structure used to represent the set .

For any data structure for the vertex set , the running time is in

The simplest version of Dijkstra's algorithm stores the vertex set  as a linked list or array, and edges as an adjacency list or matrix.

For sparse graphs, that is, graphs with far fewer than  edges, Dijkstra's algorithm can be implemented more efficiently by storing the graph in the form of adjacency lists and using a self-balancing binary search tree, binary heap, pairing heap, or Fibonacci heap as a priority queue to implement extracting minimum efficiently. To perform decrease-key steps in a binary heap efficiently, it is necessary to use an auxiliary data structure that maps each vertex to its position in the heap, and to keep this structure up to date as the priority queue  changes. With a self-balancing binary search tree or binary heap, the algorithm requires

The Fibonacci heap improves this to

Practical optimizations and infinite graphs
In common presentations of Dijkstra's algorithm, initially all nodes are entered into the priority queue. This is, however, not necessary: the algorithm can start with a priority queue that contains only one item, and insert new items as they are discovered (instead of doing a decrease-key, check whether the key is in the queue; if it is, decrease its key, otherwise insert it). This variant has the same worst-case bounds as the common variant, but maintains a smaller priority queue in practice, speeding up the queue operations.

Moreover, not inserting all nodes in a graph makes it possible to extend the algorithm to find the shortest path from a single source to the closest of a set of target nodes on infinite graphs or those too large to represent in memory. The resulting algorithm is called uniform-cost search (UCS) in the artificial intelligence literature and can be expressed in pseudocode as

 procedure uniform_cost_search(start) is
     node ← start
     frontier ← priority queue containing node only
     expanded ← empty set
     do
         if frontier is empty then
             return failure
         node ← frontier.pop()
         if node is a goal state then
             return solution(node)
         expanded.add(node)
         for each of node's neighbors n do
             if n is not in expanded and not in frontier then
                 frontier.add(n)
             else if n is in frontier with higher cost
                 replace existing node with n

Combinations of such techniques may be needed for optimal practical performance on specific problems.

Specialized variants
When arc weights are small integers (bounded by a parameter ), specialized queues which take advantage of this fact can be used to speed up Dijkstra's algorithm. The first algorithm of this type was Dial's algorithm  for graphs with positive integer edge weights, which uses a bucket queue to obtain a running time . Another interesting variant based on a combination of a new radix heap and the well-known Fibonacci heap runs in time  . Finally, the best algorithms in this special case are as follows. The algorithm given by  runs in  time and the algorithm given by  runs in  time.

Related problems and algorithms 

The functionality of Dijkstra's original algorithm can be extended with a variety of modifications. For example, sometimes it is desirable to present solutions which are less than mathematically optimal. To obtain a ranked list of less-than-optimal solutions, the optimal solution is first calculated. A single edge appearing in the optimal solution is removed from the graph, and the optimum solution to this new graph is calculated. Each edge of the original solution is suppressed in turn and a new shortest-path calculated. The secondary solutions are then ranked and presented after the first optimal solution.

Dijkstra's algorithm is usually the working principle behind link-state routing protocols, OSPF and IS-IS being the most common ones.

Unlike Dijkstra's algorithm, the Bellman–Ford algorithm can be used on graphs with negative edge weights, as long as the graph contains no negative cycle reachable from the source vertex s. The presence of such cycles means there is no shortest path, since the total weight becomes lower each time the cycle is traversed. (This statement assumes that a "path" is allowed to repeat vertices. In graph theory that is normally not allowed.  In theoretical computer science it often is allowed.) It is possible to adapt Dijkstra's algorithm to handle negative weight edges by combining it with the Bellman-Ford algorithm (to remove negative edges and detect negative cycles); such an algorithm is called Johnson's algorithm.

The A* algorithm is a generalization of Dijkstra's algorithm that cuts down on the size of the subgraph that must be explored, if additional information is available that provides a lower bound on the "distance" to the target.

The process that underlies Dijkstra's algorithm is similar to the greedy process used in Prim's algorithm.  Prim's purpose is to find a minimum spanning tree that connects all nodes in the graph; Dijkstra is concerned with only two nodes. Prim's does not evaluate the total weight of the path from the starting node, only the individual edges.

Breadth-first search can be viewed as a special-case of Dijkstra's algorithm on unweighted graphs, where the priority queue degenerates into a FIFO queue.

The fast marching method can be viewed as a continuous version of Dijkstra's algorithm which computes the geodesic distance on a triangle mesh.

Dynamic programming perspective 

From a dynamic programming point of view, Dijkstra's algorithm is a successive approximation scheme that solves the dynamic programming functional equation for the shortest path problem by the Reaching method.

In fact, Dijkstra's explanation of the logic behind the algorithm, namely

is a paraphrasing of Bellman's famous Principle of Optimality in the context of the shortest path problem.

Applications 
Least-cost paths are calculated for instance to establish tracks of electricity lines or oil pipelines. The algorithm has also been used to calculate optimal long-distance footpaths in Ethiopia and contrast them with the situation on the ground.

See also 
 A* search algorithm
 Bellman–Ford algorithm
 Euclidean shortest path
 Floyd–Warshall algorithm
 Johnson's algorithm
 Longest path problem
 Parallel all-pairs shortest path algorithm

Notes

References

External links 

 Oral history interview with Edsger W. Dijkstra, Charles Babbage Institute, University of Minnesota, Minneapolis
 Implementation of Dijkstra's algorithm using TDD, Robert Cecil Martin, The Clean Code Blog

Algorithm
1959 in computing
Graph algorithms
Search algorithms
Routing algorithms
Combinatorial optimization
Articles with example pseudocode
Dutch inventions
Graph distance